Kateryna Serebrianska (born 25 October 1977 in Simferopol) is a Ukrainian former individual rhythmic gymnast. She is the 1996 Olympics gold medalist, the 1995 World All-around champion, a two time (1995,1996) European All-around champion, and three time Grand Prix Final All-around champion.

Life and career
Serebrianska was born in Simferopol, Ukrainian SSR, Soviet Union. She started gymnastics in 1982 at age 4, with her mother Liubov as her coach at the Gratsia club in Simferopol. She later moved to the Ukrainian capital, Kyiv, to train at the Deriugina School.

Serebrianska tied Bulgaria's Maria Petrova for the all-round title at the 1995 World Championships in Vienna, Austria. She also won several individual apparatus titles: rope at the 1993 World Championships in Alicante, Spain; hoop (tied with Belarusian Larissa Lukyanenko and Bulgarian Maria Petrova), ball (tied with Ukrainian teammate Olena Vitrychenko), clubs and ribbon in the 1994 World Championships in Paris, France; ball (tied with Russians Yanina Batyrchina and Amina Zaripova) at the 1995 Worlds in Vienna, Austria; and again in 1996 in Hungary. Her sweep of all 4 event finals golds at the 1994 World Championships is one of only two times in history this has been achieved, the other being Alexandra Timoshenko, and was all the more miracle after major mistakes in the All Around final put her in 4th place after being favored to win (ironically Timoshenko in 1991 also failed to win the All Around title, coming 2nd to teammate Oksana Skaldina, prior to sweeping the event final golds). She also won the 1996 European all-round title, together with the team gold, and gold on rope, ball and ribbon finals.

As the gold medal favorite after her dominance in 1994, 1995, and early 1996, at the 1996 Atlanta Olympics, Serebrianska's technical strength, cleanliness, difficulty, and mature presentation won her the gold medal, although she had a slight fumble with the ribbon before her final toss. She was ahead of her closest rival, Russia's Yanina Batyrchina by 0.150 points going into the ribbon routine, who competed before her and dropped the ribbon.

Serebrianska, Alina Kabaeva, Olexandra Tymoshenko and Evgenia Kanaeva are the only rhythmic gymnasts to win World, European and Olympic titles.

At the 1997 European Championships in Greece, Serebrianska dropped a club at the end of her all-round clubs routine (9.825), but scores of 9.950 on both the rope and ribbon, and a 9.912 on hoop gave her an accumulated score of 29.637 and hence the bronze medal by 0.012 ahead of French competitor, Eva Serrano. In the apparatus finals, she won the gold in the rope event with a perfect 10.000, and took silver in the clubs and ribbon events. She did not compete at the 1997 World Championships due to an illness suffered by her mother. In her final major competition, the 1998 European Championships, she reached each of the apparatus final events. She won gold in the hoop final (9.950) and silver in rope (9.933). She also won bronze in the ribbon event (9.933), tying with the same score as Evgenia Pavlina of Belarus and Yanina Batyrchina of Russia, but winning the medal due to the new tie-breaker scoring system. She placed 6th (lost in the tie-breaker to Belarusian, Yulia Raskina) in the all-round final.

Serebrianska retired from rhythmic gymnastics in 1998.

Records
 Serebrianska became the first female rhythmic gymnast to hold the European, World, and Olympic all-round titles at the same time. This record was tied by Alina Kabaeva at the 2004 Athens Olympics and Evgenia Kanaeva at the 2012 London Olympics.
 Serebrianska has won gold medals in all of the apparatus in a single World Championship ( and has won on all five apparatus: rope, hoop, ball, clubs and ribbon), a record tied only by Bianka Panova, Oxana Kostina and Evgenia Kanaeva.
 Serebrianska is tied with Evgenia Kanaeva and Lilia Ignatova for three World gold medals in ball.
 Serebrianska is only one of the three rhythmic gymnasts ( with Alina Kabaeva and Evgenia Kanaeva ) to win all the Grand-slam titles (Olympics, World Championships, European Championships, World Cup Final and Grand Prix Final).

Routine music information

Detailed Olympic results

Notes and references

References

External links
 
 

1977 births
Living people
Sportspeople from Simferopol
Deriugins Gymnasts
Ukrainian rhythmic gymnasts
Gymnasts at the 1996 Summer Olympics
Olympic gymnasts of Ukraine
Olympic gold medalists for Ukraine
Olympic medalists in gymnastics
Medalists at the 1996 Summer Olympics
Medalists at the Rhythmic Gymnastics World Championships